The Northern Ireland Act 1974 was an Act of the Parliament of the United Kingdom that made provision for the government of Northern Ireland following the collapse of the Sunningdale Agreement. The Act authorised the dissolution of the Northern Ireland Assembly, and transferred its legislative powers to the Queen in Council.

The Act was intended as a temporary measure, staying in force for just one year. However, it made provision for the Secretary of State for Northern Ireland to make annual orders extending the duration of the Act. As such, the Act remained in force until the institutions created following the 1998 Belfast Agreement were up and running in late 1999.

The Act also established a Constitutional Convention, which ultimately failed to achieve cross-community consensus on new constitutional arrangements, and was permanently dissolved in 1976.

References

External links
Text of the Act

1974 in Northern Ireland
History of Northern Ireland
United Kingdom Acts of Parliament 1974
Acts of the Parliament of the United Kingdom concerning Northern Ireland